National Tertiary Route 926, or just Route 926 (or ) is a National Road Route of Costa Rica, located in the Guanacaste province.

Description
In Guanacaste province the route covers Tilarán canton (Tilarán, Tronadora districts).

References

Highways in Costa Rica